The Himalayan cuckoo (Cuculus saturatus) is a species of cuckoo in the genus Cuculus. It breeds from the Himalayas eastward to southern China and Taiwan. It migrates to southeast Asia and the Greater Sunda Islands for the winter.

It was formerly known as "Oriental cuckoo" and contained several subspecies found over most of Asia. In 2005, it was determined that this "species" consists of three distinct lineages:
 Himalayan cuckoo, Cuculus (saturatus) saturatus
 Oriental cuckoo proper, Cuculus (saturatus) optatus
 Sunda cuckoo, Cuculus (saturatus) lepidus

These are usually seen as distinct species nowadays. As the type specimen of the former "Oriental" cuckoo is a bird of the Himalayan population, the name saturatus applies to the Himalayan cuckoo if it is considered a species.

References

Himalayan cuckoo
Birds of the Himalayas
Birds of South China
Himalayan cuckoo
Himalayan cuckoo